Flabellimycena is a fungal genus in the family Mycenaceae. The genus is monotypic, containing the single South American species Flabellimycena flava. The genus was described by Canadian mycologist Scott Redhead in 1984.

See also
 List of Agaricales genera

References

Mycenaceae
Monotypic Agaricales genera
Fungi of South America